The 1571 siege of Fukazawa castle was one of a number of battles which formed Takeda Shingen's campaigns against the Hōjō clan, during Japan's Sengoku period.

History 
Having burned the town of Odawara surrounding the Hōjō home castle two years earlier, Takeda Shingen laid siege to a number of other Hōjō holdings in the surrounding provinces, including Fukazawa castle, in Suruga province.

This was the sixth time he had invaded Suruga; Fukazawa castle was held by Hōjō Tsunashige, who ultimately surrendered and withdrew to Tamanawa Castle.

References

Turnbull, Stephen (1998). 'The Samurai Sourcebook'. London: Cassell & Co.

1571 in Japan
Sieges involving Japan
Conflicts in 1571
Battles of the Sengoku period